The 2011 Intercity Football League is the fifth season of the Intercity Football League since its establishment in 2007.

Standings
Teams played each other twice.

References

External links
Chinese Taipei Football Association
FIFA.com standings
Soccerway: Inter City League 2011

Top level Taiwanese football league seasons
Intercity Football League seasons
Taipei
Taipei
1